In infrared astronomy, the L band is an atmospheric transmission window centred on 3.5 micrometres (in the mid-infrared).

Electromagnetic spectrum
Infrared imaging